Tell Zeidan is an archaeological site of the Ubaid culture in northern Syria, from about 5500 to 4000 BC. This site is included within the historical region known as Mesopotamia and the Tigris-Euphrates river system, often called the Cradle of Civilization.

An international archaeological project, the Joint Syrian-American Archaeological Research Project at Tell Zeidan, were surveying and excavating the Tell Zeidan site. The project started in 2008, two seasons were completed. The third season was scheduled to start in July 2010.
Muhammad Sarhan, director of the Raqqa Museum, and Gil Stein, director of the Oriental Institute of the University of Chicago, are co-directors of the project.

Part of the mound appears to have been looted after the start of the Syrian civil war in 2011.

Notes

External links
The dig page at the Oriental Institute of the University of Chicago
The approximate location at Wikimapia
 Press Release 10-054
Video from the dig, produced by the National Science foundation, narrated by Gil Stein of the Oriental Institute
The Land Before the Wheel - Gil Stein discusses the mound of Tell Zeidan Alternative repository at YouTube of the same NSF video. Better video and streaming quality.

See also

Cities of the ancient Near East

Neolithic sites in Syria
Archaeological sites in Raqqa Governorate